Yugoslavia competed at the 1967 Mediterranean Games held in Tunis, Tunisia.

Medalists

External links
Yugoslavia at the 1967 Mediterranean Games at the Olympic Museum Belgrade website
1967 Official Report at the International Mediterranean Games Committee

Nations at the 1967 Mediterranean Games
1967
Mediterranean Games